Christopher Rich may refer to:

Christopher Rich (theatre manager) (1657–1714), London theatre manager
Christopher Rich (actor) (born 1953), American actor